Juan Pablo Pernalete Llovera (28 December 1996 – 26 April 2017) was a student and basketball player killed during the 2017 Venezuelan protests. On 24 May the Attorney General of Venezuela, Luisa Ortega Díaz, declared that an investigation by the Public Ministry concluded that Pernalete died as the result of the impact in his chest of a tear gas canister fired by a National Guardsman. While government officials and pro-government outlets initially alleged that Pernalete had been killed with a captive bolt pistol by fellow protesters, in 2021 Tarek William Saab, Luisa Ortega's successor, acknowledged that Pernelte was killed by a tear gas canister fired by the National Guard.

Killing 
Juan Pablo Pernalete studied accounting at the Metropolitan University of Caracas, where he received a scholarship to play basketball. At the age of 20 he was wounded, during a protest in Altamira, in the Chacao municipality in Caracas on 26 April 2017. The mayor of Chacao, Ramón Muchacho, reported that he arrived at Salud Chacao without vital signs.

The following day, students marched for two hours from the Universidad Metropolitana to the place in Altamira Square where Juan Pablo Pernalete was killed, after holding a mass in the university in his honor.

On 13 July, a night march was summoned in honor of those killed during the protests, including Pernalete, marching to the places where the demonstrators died. Dissident CICPC inspector Óscar Pérez made a surprise appearance in the march, before leaving and disappearing.

Investigation 
On 24 May the Attorney General of Venezuela, Luisa Ortega Díaz, declared that an investigation by the Public Ministry concluded that Pernalete died as the result of the impact in his chest of a tear gas canister fired by a National Guardsman.

A year after Pernalete's death, the crime remained unpunished. The killing of Juan Pablo Pernalete was documented in a report by a panel of independent experts from the Organization of American States, considering that it could constitute a crime against humanity committed in Venezuela along with other killings during the protests.

While government officials and pro-government outlets initially alleged that Pernalete had been killed with a captive bolt pistol by fellow protesters, in 2021 Tarek William Saab, Luisa Ortega's successor, acknowledged that Pernelte was killed by tear gas canister fired by the National Guard (GNB). Twelve GNB officials were charged with pre-intentional homicide.

Legacy 
On 11 June 2017 Juan Pablo's father, José Pernalete, declared in a public ceremony that one of his son's dreams was to be a player for the American National Basketball Association (NBA), and that said league sent them a recognition in which they sent their solidarity for his death. He said that with this action his son reached the NBA: "Our son came to the NBA, it was not the way we wanted him to arrive, but he arrived and now we have a fourth NBA called Juan Pablo Pernalete", in reference to the three Venezuelans that have played in the league: Carl Herrera, Óscar Torres and Greivis Vásquez.

On 11 June, the Avila avenue where Pernalete died, in the El Dorado sector in Altamira, was renamed with his full in a ceremony where the mayor of Chacao, authorities from the Metropolitan University and Pernalete's friends participated.

See also 

 Human rights in Venezuela
 International Criminal Court and Venezuela
 Killing of Armando Cañizales
 Killing of Miguel Castillo
 Neomar Lander
 Killing of Paúl Moreno
 Killing of Jairo Ortiz
 Killing of Paola Ramírez
 Killing of Xiomara Scott
 Killing of Fabián Urbina
 Killing of David Vallenilla
 Timeline of the 2017 Venezuelan protests

References 

Universidad Metropolitana alumni
Filmed killings
People murdered in Venezuela
Victims of police brutality
Venezuelan basketball players
1996 births
2017 deaths
2017 Venezuelan protests
2017 murders in Venezuela
Deaths by tear gas canister